Megachile pseudobrevis, the southeastern little leaf-cutter bee, is a species of hymenopteran in the family Megachilidae.

References

Further reading

External links

 

pseudobrevis
Insects described in 1936